Baxter is an Anglo-Saxon and Scottish name, originally from the English occupational surname meaning baker, from the early Middle English bakstere and the Old English bæcere. The form Bakster was originally feminine, with Baker as the masculine equivalent, but over time both names came to apply to both men and women. Ancient variations in the spelling of the surname include Bakster, Baxstar, Baxstair, Baxstare and Baxster.

People with the surname

A
 Al Baxter, Australian rugby union player
 Alain Baxter, Scottish skier
 Alan Baxter (disambiguation), the name of several people
 Alexander Baxter, Scottish-Australian politician
 Alexander G. Baxter (1859–1934), New York state senator
 Alfred Baxter (disambiguation), the name of several people
 Amy Lynn Baxter, American model and actress
 Anne Baxter, American  actress
 Annie Baxter, American radio reporter
 Annie White Baxter (1864–1944), Missouri politician
 Archibald Baxter, New Zealand pacifist
 Archie E. Baxter (1844–1925), Scottish-American lawyer and politician
 Arlene Baxter, American model
 Ashleigh Baxter (born 1991), Irish rugby union player

B
 Batsell Baxter, American religious leader and educator
 Biddy Baxter, British TV producer
 Bill Baxter (disambiguation), the name of several people
 Billy Baxter (disambiguation), the name of several people
 Blake Baxter, American electronic musician
 Brad Baxter, American football player
 Bucky Baxter (1955–2020), American guitarist

C
 Charles Baxter (disambiguation), the name of several people
 Colin Baxter (born 1987), American football player
 Colin Baxter (curler), Scottish curler

D
 Darren Baxter (disambiguation), the name of several people
 David Baxter (disambiguation), the name of several people
 Delos W. Baxter (1857–1918), American politician and lawyer
 Dorian Baxter, Canadian Anglican priest

E
 Edward Felix Baxter, British soldier
 Elisha Baxter, American jurist and politician
 Esther Baxter, American model
 Evan Buchanan Baxter (1844–1885), Russian-born Scottish physician
 E. V. Baxter (1879–1959), Scottish ornithologist

F
 Frank Baxter (disambiguation), the name of several people
 Fred Baxter, American football player
 Frederick William Baxter (1858–1937), Australian amusements

G
 Gary Baxter, football player
 George Baxter (disambiguation), the name of several people
 Glen Baxter (disambiguation), the name of several people
 Gordon Baxter, American aviator
 Gregg Baxter, sound editor
 Gregory Baxter, Canadian ski jumper

H
 Henry Baxter, American general

I
 Iain Baxter& (born 1936), Canadian conceptual artist
 Iain Baxter (curler) (1948–2015), Scottish curler
 Irvin Baxter Jr., American Christian apologist
 Irving Baxter, American athlete

J
 J. Clifford Baxter, Enron executive
 J.R. Baxter (1887–1960), American gospel musician
 J. Sidlow Baxter, Australian theologian
 Jacob Baxter, Canadian politician
 James Baxter (disambiguation), several people named James, Jim or Jimmy
 Jane Baxter, German-born British actress
 Jayne Baxter, Scottish politician
 Jean Rae Baxter, Canadian author
 Jeff Baxter, American guitarist and government consultant
 John Baxter (disambiguation), the name of several people
 Jose Baxter, English footballer, currently playing for Sheffield United

K
 Kay Baxter, American bodybuilder
 Ken Baxter (disambiguation), the name of several people

L
 Laurence Baxter, British statistician
 Les Baxter, American pianist 
 Lois Baxter, British actress
 Lonny Baxter, American basketball player
 Luther Loren Baxter (1832–1915), American politician, lawyer, and judge
 Lydia Baxter (1809–1874), American poet
 Lynsey Baxter, British actress

M
 Marion Babcock Baxter (1850–1910), American lecturer, author, financial agent
 Marvin R. Baxter, American judge
 Mary Ann Baxter (1801–1884), Scottish philanthropist
 Matthew Baxter, paranormal investigator, skeptic
 Meredith Baxter (born 1947), American actress

N
 Nathan D. Baxter, bishop of the Episcopal Diocese of Central Pennsylvania
 Nick Baxter (disambiguation), the name of several people
 Noel Baxter (born 1981), Scottish skier

P
 Paul Baxter, Canadian ice hockey player and assistant coach
 Percival P. Baxter, governor of the U.S. state of Maine
 Peter Baxter (disambiguation), the name of several people

R
 Raven Baxter, American science communicator
 Raymond Baxter, British television personality
 Richard Baxter (disambiguation), the name of several people
 Rick Baxter, American politician
 Rob Baxter, British rugby player
 Robert Dudley Baxter, British economist
 Rodney Baxter, Australian physicist
 Rowan Baxter, former NRL player, perpetrator of Murder of Hannah Clarke

S
 Skippy Baxter, American figure skater
 Stanley Baxter, Scottish comedian
 Stephen Baxter (disambiguation), the name of several people called Stephen or Steve
 Stuart Baxter, British football manager

T
 Thelma Farr Baxter (1912–1996), American politician and schoolteacher
 Thomas Baxter (disambiguation), the name of several people called Tom, Thomas or Tommy
 Tony Baxter, American Disney Imagineer
 Trevor Baxter, British actor
 Troy Baxter Jr., American basketball player

V
 Virginia Baxter, American figure skater

W
 Walter Baxter, English novelist
 Warner Baxter, American actor
 William Baxter (disambiguation), the name of several people
 Wynne Edwin Baxter, English lawyer and coroner

People with the given name 
 Baxter Black (1945–2022), American cowboy, poet, philosopher, former large-animal veterinarian, and radio commentator
 Baxter Dury, pop singer, son of Ian Dury

Fictional characters with the name
 Baxter, Ron Burgundy's dog in the film Anchorman: The Legend of Ron Burgundy
 Baxter (mascot), the mascot for the Arizona Diamondbacks baseball team
 Baxter Basics, character from British comic Viz
 Baxter Stockman, in the Teenage Mutant Ninja Turtles series
 Bella Gloria Baxter, Jeffery Baxter, Charlotte Baxter, George Baxter and Alice Baxter, in Miss BG
 Bruce Baxter, lead character in Peter Jackson's King Kong (2005 film)
 Buster Baxter, character from American children's Arthur (TV series)
 C. C. Baxter (Calvin Cliff), played by Jack Lemmon in The Apartment, 1960 film
 Chris Baxter, a police chief in the 2002 flash animated series Joe Zombie
 Corrine Baxter, in Strange Days at Blake Holsey High
 Cory Baxter, in That's So Raven and Cory in the House
 Denton Baxter, Irish landowner in Open Range (2003 film) played by Michael Gambon
 Evan Baxter, played by Steve Carell in Evan Almighty (2007 film)
 Georgette Franklin Baxter, in The Mary Tyler Moore Show
 Mike Baxter, played by Tim Allen in Last Man Standing (U.S. TV series)
 Phyllis Baxter, lady's maid to the Countess of Grantham in Downton Abbey
 Raven Baxter, in That's So Raven
 Robert Baxter, in Time Crisis II
 Roger Baxter, Lauren "Betty" Baxter and Blythe Baxter in Littlest Pet Shop (2012 TV series)
 Rupert Baxter, Lord Emsworth's secretary in the stories of P. G. Wodehouse
 Tanya Baxter, in That's So Raven
 Ted Baxter, in The Mary Tyler Moore Show
 Victor Baxter, in That's So Raven and Cory in the House
 Mr. Baxter, in The Adventures of Tintin
 C.O. Baxter Bayley in Orange Is the New Black

See also 
 Baxter baronets, two Baronetcies in the Baronetage of the United Kingdom
 H. P. Baxxter, stage name of musician Hans Peter Geerdes

References 

English-language surnames
Occupational surnames
English-language occupational surnames